See the Glossary of underwater diving terminology for definitions of technical terms, jargon, diver slang and acronyms used in underwater diving
 See the Outline of underwater diving for a hierarchical listing of underwater diving related articles
 See the Outline of recreational dive sites for a hierarchical listing of articles about sites used for recreational diving
 See the Index of underwater divers for an alphabetical listing of articles about underwater divers
 See the Index of underwater diving for an alphabetical listing of underwater diving related articles

The following index is provided as an overview of and topical guide to Wikipedia's articles on recreational dive sites. The level of coverage may vary:

 Recreational dive sites – specific places that recreational divers go to enjoy the underwater environment or are used for training purposes.

A 
  – The Royal Navy's first British-designed submarine
  – A-class submarine of the Royal Navy
  – Gleaves-class destroyer of the United States Navy
  – German ship wrecked at the Farne Islands in 1921. Now a dive site
  
 
  
 
  – Greek registered freighter sunk off Dorset after a collision
 
 
  
  – Canadian cargo ship, sunk off the Needles during World War II
  
 Aliwal Shoal – A rocky reef off the coast of KwaZulu-Natal, South Africa
 
 
  
 
 
 SS America – Steam packet wrecked off Isle Royale in Lake Superior
  
  – Genoa registered passenger liner of the Italian line sunk after a collision off Massachusetts
  – Marine protected sanctuary in Mabini, Batangas
  – Hamburg America Line cargo ship scuttled in 1940 off Aruba
  – French cruise ship that ran aground and sank off Mustique
 
 
  
  – British built cargo ship sunk off Ambon
 
 
  
 Arrecifes de Cozumel National Park – Marine protected area in the Cozumel reef system off Mexico

B 
 
 
 
 
 
  – Passenger ship sunk off Grenada
 
  
 
 
 
  – B-class destroyer of the Royal Navy, sunk by enemy action in Lyme Bay
 
 
 Booya – Three masted steel schooner wrecked in Darwin, Australia
 
  – Dutch ship sunk off Scotland in 1940, now a recreational dive site.
 
  – Perth-class guided missile destroyer of the Royal Australian Navy sunk as a dive site off the Queensland coast
 
 
 
 
 Bungsberg – German cargo ship sunk near Tallinn, Estonia

C 
  
  – Adelaide class guided missile frigate of the Royal Australian Navy scuttled as dive site off Barwon Heads, Victoria
 
 
  
 Capernwray Dive Centre – Flooded quarry in Lancashire, England, used as a recreational dive site.
 Captain Keith Tibbetts – Former Cuban Navy Koni II-class frigate scuttled in shallow water in Cayman Brac
  
  – Self-unloading Great Lakes freighter that sank in a Lake Michigan storm
 
  – British steamship wrecked in the gulf of Suez
  
 SS Cedarville – Great lakes bulk carrier wrecked in a collision
 
 
 
 
 Chuuk Lagoon – A sheltered body of water in the central Pacific in the Federated States of Micronesia

D 
 
 
  
 
 Devil's Throat at Punta Sur – Underwater cave near Cozumel, Mexico
 
 Dorothea Quarry, Nantlle Valley, Gwynedd, North Wales. 
 
 Dosthill quarry, near Tamworth, Staffordshire
 
  – German light cruiser scuttled in Scapa Flow
  
  
  – British cargo vessel wrecked in the Gulf of Suez
 Dutch Springs, Bethlehem, Pennsylvania

E 
  
  – Ship sunk off Cornwall 1n 1917, now a dive site
  
  
 
 
 
 
  – British trawler sunk off Plymouth in 1940, now a recreational dive site.
  – Schooner rigged single screw steamer which sank at moorings in Darwin, Australia
 
  
  – Ocean liner which sank near the mouth of the Saint Lawrence River after a collision
 Engelbrecht Cave – Cave system in Mount Gambier, South Australia
 
  
 Ewens Ponds – Flooded sinkhole system in the south east of South Australia

F 
  – Town-class light cruiser of the Royal Navy sunk off Flamborough Head, Yorkshire by German submarines
  
 
 Fifi – Tugboat that caught fire and sank in Bahrain
 Fossil Cave – A flooded cave in the Limestone Coast region of South Australia
 
  – German built cargo ship wrecked in Lake Michigan
 
 
 Fujikawa Maru – Japanese armed transport ship sunk in Truk lagoon
 Japanese destroyer Fumizuki (1926) – Mutsuki-class destroyer of the Imperial Japanese Navy sunk at Truk

G 
 
  
 
 USNS General Hoyt S. Vandenberg – US Navy transport ship sunk as artificial reef at Key West
 
 
 
  – Tribal-class destroyer of the Royal Navy sunk off Dungeness by a German mine
 
 
 
 Glen Strathallan –British ship scuttled in Plymouth sound as a dive site 
 
 
  – British steamship wrecked on the Great Barrier Reef
 Great Barrier Reef – Coral reef system off the east coast of Australia, World Heritage Site

H 
 
 
 
 
 Herzogin Cecilie – German-built four-masted barque wrecked near Salcombe
 
 Hilma Hooker – Shipwreck in Bonaire in the Caribbean Netherlands
  – Swedish steamship wrecked in the Sound of Mull, now a dive site
  – Former guided missile destroyer of the Royal Australian Navy scuttled off Yankalilla Bay in South Australia
  
  – Royal Sovereign-class battleship of the Royal Navy scuttled in Portland Harbour

I 
 Igara – Bulk carrier wrecked off the east coast of Malaysia and partly salvaged

J 
 
 
 
 
  – Liberty ship sunk off Cornwall, now a dive site

K 
  
 King Cruiser – Car ferry of that sank off the West Coast of Southern Thailand
 
  – German battleship scuttled in Scapa Flow
 Kyarra – Cargo and passenger luxury liner torpedoed and sunk near Swanage

L 
   
  – Royal Navy destroyer sunk by a mine off Sussex
 
  – United States Army cargo ship torpedoed by Japanese submarine and beached on the island of Bali.
 List of shipwrecks in the Thunder Bay National Marine Sanctuary 
 Little Blue Lake – Flooded sinkhole dive site in South Australia
  
  – Belgian ship sunk off Devon on 1939. Now a recreational dive site
  – US Tank landing ship sunk off the south coast of England, now a dive site

M 
  – Royal Navy submarine monitor wrecked in Lyme Bay
  
 
  – British ship sunk in 1917 near Dartmouth, Devon. Now a recreational dive site
  – UK registered passenger steamship sunk by a mine off Dover
 
 
 
  – Royal Navy Tribal class destroyer sunk in Malta
 
 Marguerite – French ship sunk in Lyme Bay in 1917. Now a dive site
 Maritime Heritage Trail – Battle of Saipan – A group of WWII wrecks in the lagoon at Saipan in the Northern Mariana Islands
  – German battleship scuttled in Scapa Flow
 
  – Cargo steam-ship sunk in the bombing of Darwin
  – United States Army transport ship sunk in Darwin Harbour
  – Passenger steamship that sank after a collision south of the Isle of Wight
 
 
 
  – Soviet cruise liner wrecked in the Marlborough Sounds, New Zealand
 SS Milwaukee – Great lakes train ferry that foundered in a storm
 
  
 
  – US Coastguard cutter sunk as artificial reef off south-west Florida
  – Steamer wrecked off the coast of the Lizard Peninsula, Cornwall
 
  – British ship sunk in 1918 off Beachy Head, now a dive site
 
 
 
  – Pre-dreadnought battleship of the British Royal Navy wrecked on Lundy Island
  – German owned container ship wrecked at Land's End, United Kingdom

N 
 Nagato – Super-dreadnought sunk by nuclear test in Bikini atoll
 National Diving and Activity Centre – Flooded quarry in Gloucestershire used as a recreational dive site

O 
  – Cargo and passenger ship sunk off Beachy Head after a collision
 
  
  – Essex class aircraft carrier sunk to create an artificial reef
 
  – Ocean liner sunk after hitting a mine off the River Tyne

P 
 P29 – Ship scuttled as dive site off Malta
 P31 – Minesweeper/patrol boat scuttled for use as a recreational dive site
 Palancar Reef – Coral reef off Cozumel, Mexico in the Caribbean sea
 
 
  
 
  – Lake tanker damaged by a torpedo at Aruba, where part of the ship remains
  – British ship sunk in Plymouth Sound in 1945. Now a dive site
  – Guided missile destroyer of the Australian Navy, sunk as a dive site off Western Australia
 
 
 
 Piccaninnie Ponds – Protected area near Mount Gambier in South Australia
 
  
  – Polish passenger ship sunk off the Yorkshire coast
  
  
  – British merchant vessel that sank off the Isle of Wight
 Poor Knights Islands – Group of islands and marine reserve off the east coast of new Zealand's North Island
 
  
 
  
  – Royal Navy minelayer destroyed in Loch Alsh, Scotland, by an explosion following an engine room fire
 
  
  – American ocean liner sunk by mines in the New Hebrides
 Preußen – German steel-hulled five-masted ship-rigged windjammer sunk in Crab Bay after a collision
 
 Protea banks – A reef about 7 km off the south coast of KwaZulu-Natal, South Africa

Q 
  – Paddle steamer wrecked off the Baily Lighthouse, Ireland

R 
  – Ship sunk in 1917 near Portland Bill, now a dive site 
  – Greenpeace vessel bombed by French intelligence service operatives in Auckland harbour, refloated and scuttled as a dive site
   
 SS Regina – Steel ship that foundered in Lake Huron in a storm
 
  – Royal Mail Ship wrecked off Salt Island in the British Virgin Islands in a hurricane
 
  
 
  – Ship sunk in Sound of Mull in 1935, now a recreational dive site
  – Steam collier torpedoed and sunk near Fowey, Cornwall
  – Iron sailing ship wrecked on Chesil Beach
 Royal Charter – Steam clipper wrecked off Porth Alerth on the coast of Anglesey
  – Tugboat scuttled as a dive site off Malta

S 
  – Royal Navy S-class submarine sunk in the English Channel while on tow to shipbreakers
 
  
  – Car and passenger ferry wrecked off the Egyptian coast
 
 
 
  – US Navy aircraft carrier sunk by nuclear weapon testing at Bikini atoll
 
 Sardine run – Annual fish migration off the shores of South Africa
  
  
  – Admirable class minesweeper sunk as an artificial reef off Cozumel 
  – Royal Navy frigate sunk as artificial reef off Whitsand Bay, Cornwall
  
 
 
 
  – Royal Navy submarine sunk in Portland Harbour by explosion of a faulty torpedo
 
 
 
 
 Sodwana Bay – A National Park with marine protected area on the northern KwaZulu-Natal coast of South Africa
 
  
 
  – US Navy dock landing ship sunk off Key Largo as an artificial reef
 
  
 Stanegarth – Steam tugboat scuttled as a dive feature at Stoney Cove
  – British ship sunk off Falmouth in 1939, now a recreational dive site
  – Passenger ferry wrecked off the Casquets
 
 Stoney Cove – Flooded quarry in Leicestershire used for scuba diving
 
  – Australian "River" class destroyer sunk as a dive site off the coast of Dunsborough, Western Australia

T 
 Table Mountain National Park Marine Protected Area – Marine protected area around the coast of the Cape Peninsula
 
 
  – US Navy Submarine which foundered south of Cape Hatteras, North Carolina, while under tow to the scrap yard. 
 
 
  – Steamship wrecked in 1889 in the Sound of Mull, Scotland. Now a recreational dive site.
  – British armed merchantman sunk in the Red Sea at Ras Muhammad
 
 
 Toa Maru – Japanese transport ship sunk by a submarine off Gizo, Solomon Islands
  – Suezmax Class oil tanker wrecked off the western coast of Cornwall
 
 
 
 
 
 Tulagi – Small island north of Guadalcanal in the Solomon Islands

U 
  – German submarine sunk by a mine in the English Channel
  – German submarine sunk by depth charges south of Morehead City, North Carolina
  – German submarine sunk by antisubmarine mortar to the southeast of the Isle of Wight
 Um El Faroud – Libyan owned tanker scuttled as dive site off Malta

V 
  – Greek freighter wrecked at The Needles in a storm after engine failure
   
  
 SS Vienna – Steamship sunk after a collision in Lake Superior

W 
  
 
 
  – German freighter wrecked in St George's Channel
  
  – American freighter that sank off Delaware after a collision
 
 
  – Leander class frigate sunk as artificial reef off Wellington, New Zealand
  
 Whitefish Point Underwater Preserve – A reserve to protect and conserve shipwrecks and historical resources in Lake Superior
 
 
 Wreck Alley, San Diego – Recreational dive area with several wrecks sunk as artificial reefs

Y 
  – Andromeda-class attack cargo ship sunk as an artificial reef off North Carolina
 
  – Australian registered passenger ship that sank off Cape Bowling Green, Queensland, Australia

Z 
 
  – RO-RO ferry that capsized and sank near Larnaca, Cyprus
  – Australian cargo and passenger steamship sunk in the bombing of Darwin
 Zingara – Cargo vessel wrecked in the Straits of Tiran in the Red Sea

See also 

 Glossary of underwater diving terminology

References

External links 

 

Underwater diving